Craig Keystone Monroe (nicknamed "C. Mo") (born February 27, 1977) is a former Major League Baseball (MLB) outfielder and current sportscaster. He played for the  Texas Rangers, Detroit Tigers, Chicago Cubs, Minnesota Twins and Pittsburgh Pirates and is currently an analyst for Detroit Tigers TV broadcasts on Bally Sports Detroit as well as the Detroit Tigers Radio Network.

Professional career
On July 29, 2001, at Arlington, Texas, Monroe hit a home run in his first major league game for the Texas Rangers, contributing to a 2-0 victory over the visiting Tampa Bay Devil Rays.

Monroe then joined the Detroit Tigers organization on February 1, 2002, when he was selected off waivers from the Rangers. Playing his first full season in 2003, Monroe hit 23 home runs.

On July 19, 2006, Monroe hit a grand slam home run off Javier Vázquez of the Chicago White Sox which was decisive in the Tigers 5–2 win. At the time, the teams were locked in a struggle for the American League Central division lead. Monroe called it "by far the biggest one I've ever hit." Monroe led Detroit with 28 home runs that season, as the Tigers turned around more than a decade of losing with 95 wins, and he was second on the team with 92 RBIs. He also hit five home runs in the 2006 postseason, which culminated in a World Series appearance.

On August 17, 2007, the Tigers designated Monroe for assignment. On August 23, he was traded to the Chicago Cubs for a player to be named later. Monroe played with the Cubs for the remainder of the 2007 season. The Tigers received Clay Rapada to complete the trade. On November 13, Monroe was traded to the Minnesota Twins for a player to be named later. On August 1, 2008, Monroe was designated for assignment by the Twins and released on August 8.

Monroe signed a minor league deal with the Pittsburgh Pirates on January 13, 2009. Monroe was added to the Major League roster at the end of spring training. Monroe was designated for assignment on June 20 to make room on the roster for Steve Pearce. Monroe was released on July 1, after which he retired as an active player.

Retirement activities
Monroe became a studio analyst for the Detroit Tigers on Bally Sports Detroit in 2012 and started serving as an occasional color analyst on game broadcasts. In 2022, Monroe could be heard on the Detroit Tigers Radio Network as a color-commentator alongside play-by-play announcer Dan Dickerson on select road games. Monroe was promoted to the primary analyst for Tigers game broadcasts on Bally Sports Detroit in 2023.

In 2019, he launched his signature men's fashion line called "This is your fault for having eyes". After designing each suit, he breaks down his decisions in and about his signature style.

Personal life
Monroe's mother's name is Marilyn Monroe, the same as that of the late actress. She was on hand to watch her son hit a go-ahead home run against the New York Yankees at Yankee Stadium on August 30, 2006. After the game, he told the media, "Marilyn Monroe is here in New York, and I'm thrilled." Monroe and his wife, Kasey, have three children.

References

External links

1977 births
Living people
African-American baseball players
Baseball players from Dallas
Charleston RiverDogs players
Chicago Cubs players
Detroit Tigers announcers
Detroit Tigers players
Hudson Valley Renegades players
Major League Baseball broadcasters
Major League Baseball left fielders
Minnesota Twins players
Oklahoma RedHawks players
People from Texarkana, Texas
Pittsburgh Pirates players
Sportspeople from Arlington, Texas
Texas Rangers players
Toledo Mud Hens players
Tulsa Drillers players
21st-century African-American sportspeople
20th-century African-American sportspeople